Jack Bloom is a South African politician who has been a Member of the Gauteng Provincial Legislature since 1994, representing the Democratic Party from 1994 until 2003 and the Democratic Alliance from 2003 onwards. Bloom is the DA's shadow MEC for health. Bloom was the DA caucus leader and the Leader of the Opposition in the provincial legislature from December 2007 to April 2009 and again from March 2011 until May 2014.

Background
Bloom was born in Doornfontein in Johannesburg in 1961. He attended Athlone Boys' High School. He obtained BA and Honours degrees in industrial psychology from the University of the Witwatersrand. He also holds an MBA from the university. As of 2019, he is completing a PhD in ancient Jewish history.

Bloom is Jewish.

Political career
Bloom was a volunteer worker for the Progressive Federal Party in the early 1980s. In 1991, he was elected as the ward councillor for Highlands North as a member of the Democratic Party. He was the youngest DP member in the City of Johannesburg council. In 1994, Bloom was elected to the Gauteng Provincial Legislature as one of five DP members. Bloom was then appointed chief whip of the DP caucus. He was re-elected to the provincial legislature in 1999.

In 2000, the Democratic Alliance was formed when the DP merged with the New National Party and the Federal Alliance. Bloom was given dual-party membership and officially became a DA representative during the 2003 floor-crossing period. He was re-elected in 2004 as the DA's support grew. In December 2007, the DA caucus elected him caucus leader and he then became leader of the opposition in the provincial legislature.

Bloom was re-elected in 2009. In March 2011, he once again became DA caucus leader and leader of the opposition. Prior to the 2014 general election, he applied to be the DA's Gauteng premier candidate. The DA selected Mmusi Maimane. Bloom was re-elected to another term in the provincial legislature in the election. After the election, John Moodey was elected leader of the DA GPL caucus. Bloom was then appointed Shadow MEC for Health.

Bloom was re-elected to the legislature in 2019 and remained as shadow health MEC.

References

External links

Living people
1961 births
People from Gauteng
Democratic Party (South Africa) politicians
Democratic Alliance (South Africa) politicians
Members of the Gauteng Provincial Legislature
20th-century South African politicians
21st-century South African politicians